Sulka may mean: 
The Sulka language of Papua New Guinea
Amos Sulka & Company, a defunct maker of men's wear.

See also 
 Sulca